The 2017–18 EIHL season was the 15th season of the Elite Ice Hockey League. The regular season commenced on 9 September 2017 and ended on 25 March 2018. The reigning league champions were the Cardiff Devils, who won the championship for the first time in 2016–17. The Devils retained their regular season title, with a 3–2 victory away at the Belfast Giants on 16 March 2018. The Devils also won the playoff title, beating the Sheffield Steelers – who had defeated the Devils 12 months prior in a 6–5 double overtime game – 3–1 in the final, winning a first playoff title since 1998–99.

Teams
The league expanded from ten teams to twelve teams for the 2017–18 season, with the introduction of two former English Premier Ice Hockey League teams; the Guildford Flames and the Milton Keynes Lightning.

Starting from the 2017–18 season, the league featured three conferences of four teams compared to the previous season's two conferences of five teams. The Gardiner Conference became an all-Scottish division, with the Braehead Clan, the Dundee Stars, the Edinburgh Capitals and the Fife Flyers. The Manchester Storm, who were part of the Gardiner Conference in 2016–17, moved to a new Southern conference: the Patton Conference. Also part of the division were the Coventry Blaze (moving from the Erhardt Conference), the Guildford Flames and the Milton Keynes Lightning. The final conference was the Erhardt Conference, consisting of the four "Arena" teams: the Belfast Giants, the Cardiff Devils, the Nottingham Panthers and the Sheffield Steelers.

Standings

Overall
All games counted towards the overall Elite League standings. Each team played 56 matches; 24 matches against their three Conference rivals, and 32 against the eight teams from the other Conferences. The Cardiff Devils became regular season champions for the second successive season, with a 3–2 win over the Belfast Giants on 16 March 2018 at SSE Arena Belfast.

Erhardt Conference
Only intra-conference games counted towards the Erhardt Conference standings. Each team played the other three teams in the Conference eight times, for a total of 24 matches. The Cardiff Devils won the Conference for the third season in a row, with a 3–2 win over the Belfast Giants on 16 March 2018 at SSE Arena Belfast.

Gardiner Conference
Only intra-conference games counted towards the Gardiner Conference standings. Each team played the other three teams in the Conference eight times, for a total of 24 matches. The Fife Flyers won the Conference for the first time, with a 7–6 overtime win over the Dundee Stars on 18 February 2018 at the Dundee Ice Arena.

Patton Conference
Only intra-conference games counted towards the Patton Conference standings. Each team played the other three teams in the Conference eight times, for a total of 24 matches. The Manchester Storm won the inaugural Conference, after the Coventry Blaze defeated the Storm's closest challengers, the Guildford Flames, 3–1 on 18 March 2018 at the Guildford Spectrum.

Playoffs

Bracket

Quarter-finals

(1) Cardiff Devils vs. (8) Coventry Blaze

(2) Manchester Storm vs. (7) Fife Flyers

(3) Sheffield Steelers vs. (6) Guildford Flames

(4) Nottingham Panthers vs. (5) Belfast Giants

Semi-finals

Third-place match

Grand Final

Regular season statistics

Scoring leaders
The following players led the league in points at the conclusion of the regular season.

Leading goaltenders
The following goaltenders led the league in goals against average, while playing at least 1200 minutes, at the conclusion of the regular season.

Playoff statistics

Scoring leaders
The following players led the league in points at the conclusion of the playoffs.

Leading goaltenders
The following goaltenders led the league in goals against average, while playing at least 60 minutes, at the conclusion of the playoffs.

References

External links

Elite Ice Hockey League seasons
1
United